Shaheeya Lake is located in Glacier National Park, in the U.S. state of Montana. Shaheeya Lake is east of Shaheeya Peak.

See also
List of lakes in Glacier County, Montana

References

Lakes of Glacier National Park (U.S.)
Lakes of Glacier County, Montana